Veneta is a city in Lane County, Oregon, United States. As of the 2010 census, the city population was 4,561.

History
Veneta was established in 1912 by Edmund Eugene Hunter, who named the settlement after his five-year-old daughter. Veneta post office was established in 1914. Veneta Hunter Vincent, the city's namesake, died in 2000 at age 91. She had attended the city's 70th anniversary party in 1982.

Veneta has been the site of the annual Oregon Country Fair, originally called the Renaissance Faire, since 1970.

On August 27, 1972, the Grateful Dead played a concert—the first "Field Trip"—at the Oregon Country Fair site. The concert, a benefit for Springfield Creamery, has become legendary to Deadheads and is documented in the film Sunshine Daydream. The city's name is used on Veneta, Oregon, a 2004 release by New Riders of the Purple Sage, which is a live recording of the group's opening performance at the 1972 Field Trip.

Geography

Climate
This region experiences warm (but not hot) and dry summers, with no average monthly temperatures above .  According to the Köppen Climate Classification system, Veneta has a warm-summer Mediterranean climate, abbreviated "Csb" on climate maps.

Infrastructure

Utilities
The city of Veneta gets its drinking water from three deep wells located within the city limits. In 2013, a  pipeline was completed which connected the city of Veneta to the Eugene Water & Electric Board (EWEB), allowing the city to purchase surplus water from EWEB. The  pipeline supplies the city with an extra  of water per day and provides the city with 20% of its water supply.

Recreation 

Veneta is located adjacent to Fern Ridge Reservoir. The reservoir is popular for water sports, kayaking, sailing, fishing and swimming. Surrounding the reservoir is the Fern Ridge Wildlife Area, which is popular for bird watching and contains several parks with picnic areas, hiking trails, and some canoe and kayak access to the wetlands.

Inside the city is the outdoor, public swimming pool, which is open to swimmers during the summer months. Located off Territorial Highway is Veneta's skate park. The  concrete park was constructed for local skateboarding and roller skating. The skate park is adjacent to basketball courts and a children's playground.

Veneta provides outdoor sports fields at the Bolton Hill Sports Complex located off Bolton Hill Road. This is an  sports area with baseball and soccer fields. The Bolton Hill Sports Complex have been used by the Territorial Sports Program (TSP) to provide baseball and soccer activities for local youth.

Demographics

2010 census
As of the census of 2010, there were 4,561 people, 1,730 households, and 1,241 families living in the city. The racial makeup of the city was 91.8% White, 0.4% African American, 1.4% Native American, 0.8% Asian, 0.2% Pacific Islander, 1.9% from other races, and 3.6% from two or more races. Hispanic or Latino of any race were 5.5% of the population.

There were 1,730 households, of which 36.3% had children under the age of 18 living with them, 52.9% were married couples living together, 13.0% had a female householder with no husband present, 5.8% had a male householder with no wife present, and 28.3% were non-families. 20.5% of all households were made up of individuals, and 6.2% had someone living alone who was 65 years of age or older. The average household size was 2.62 and the average family size was 2.98.

The median age in the city was 35.2 years. 25.4% of residents were under the age of 18; 7.5% were between the ages of 18 and 24; 30.4% were from 25 to 44; 26% were from 45 to 64; and 10.7% were 65 years of age or older. The gender makeup of the city was 49.3% male and 50.7% female.

2000 census
As of the census of 2000, there were 2,755 people, 966 households, and 732 families living in the city. The population density was 1,035.5 people per square mile (399.9/km). There were 1,015 housing units at an average density of 381.5 per square mile (147.3/km). The racial makeup of the city was 92.92% White, 0.25% African American, 1.38% Native American, 0.65% Asian, 0.04% Pacific Islander, 0.91% from other races, and 3.85% from two or more races. Hispanic or Latino of any race were 4.17% of the population.

There were 966 households, out of which 43.7% had children under the age of 18 living with them, 56.7% were married couples living together, 13.3% had a female householder with no husband present, and 24.2% were non-families. 18.4% of all households were made up of individuals, and 6.3% had someone living alone who was 65 years of age or older. The average household size was 2.85 and the average family size was 3.23.

In the city, the population was spread out, with 33.0% under the age of 18, 7.7% from 18 to 24, 30.5% from 25 to 44, 21.3% from 45 to 64, and 7.5% who were 65 years of age or older. The median age was 33 years. For every 100 females, there were 95.9 males. For every 100 females age 18 and over, there were 93.2 males.

The median income for a household in the city was $37,326, and the median income for a family was $40,909. Males had a median income of $33,897 versus $18,730 for females. The per capita income for the city was $16,239. About 11.4% of families and 9.7% of the population were below the poverty line, including 16.2% of those under age 18 and 7.2% of those age 65 or over.

References

External links
Entry for Veneta in the Oregon Blue Book

Cities in Oregon
Cities in Lane County, Oregon
Populated places established in 1912
1912 establishments in Oregon